Station may refer to:

Agriculture
 Station (Australian agriculture), a large Australian landholding used for livestock production
 Station (New Zealand agriculture), a large New Zealand farm used for grazing by sheep and cattle
 Cattle station, a cattle-rearing station in Australia or New Zealand
Sheep station, a sheep-rearing station in Australia or New Zealand

Communications
 Radio communication station, a radio frequency communication station of any kind, including audio, TV, and non-broadcast uses
 Radio broadcasting station, an audio station intended for reception by the general public
 Amateur radio station, a station operating on frequencies allocated for ham or other non-commercial use
 Broadcast relay station
 Ground station (or Earth station), a terrestrial radio station for extraplanetary telecommunication with satellites or spacecraft
 Television station
 Courier station, a relay station in a courier system
 Station of the cursus publicus, a state-run courier system of the Roman Empire
 Station (networking), a device capable of using the IEEE 802.11 networking protocol
 Google Station, a public WiFi service

Geography
 Gauging station, or stream gauge, a location along a river or stream used for gauging or other measurements
 Hill station, a town which is high enough to be relatively cool in summer, mostly in colonial Asia and Africa

Infrastructure
 Charging station, a device or location that supplies electric energy for recharging electric vehicles
 Filling station, a facility for refilling a vehicle with liquid fuel
 Fire station or firehouse, a base for firefighters
 Police station, a base for police officers
 Research station, an often remote place where scientific research is conducted
 Weather station. a place where meteorological readings are taken

Military and government
 Diplomatic mission or station, where a diplomatic/consular official (or mission) is posted
 Military base
 Naval air station, an airbase of the United States Navy
 Royal Air Force station
 Royal Naval Air Station
 Station (frontier defensive structure)

Music, film, and entertainment
 Station (album), by the band Russian Circles
 Station (1981 film), a Japanese film directed by Yasuo Furuhata
 Station (2014 film), a Hindi thriller released in India
 Station (TV series), an Armenian TV series
 Station.com, a game portal operated by Sony Online Entertainment
 Stations (film), a 1983 Canadian film directed by William D. MacGillivray
 SM Station, a South Korean digital music channel operated by S.M. Entertainment
 Station, a fictional alien character in the 1991 film Bill & Ted's Bogus Journey
 "Stations", a song from the album Churn by the band Shihad

Places
 Station, California, former name of Laws, California
 Station, California, former name of Zurich, California
 La Station, a community centre in Montreal, originally designed by Ludwig Mies van der Rohe

Transport
 Bus station
 Metro station or subway station, a transit rail station
 Station (roller coaster), the place guests load a roller coaster train
 Train order station, a control point at which trains can be stopped and controlled
 Train station, also known as railway station or railroad station
 Tram stop, a tram, streetcar, or light rail station

Other uses
 Station, one of the four bases on a baseball field
 Station, a term for social status or official rank, based on one's position and prestige in society
 Station, in childbirth, the position of the baby in the birth canal
 Stations of the Cross, in Western Christian churches, a series of depictions of Jesus on the day of his crucifixion

See also
 Service station (disambiguation)
 Station to Station (disambiguation)
 The Station (disambiguation)
 
 
 Depot (disambiguation)